Thelyssina is a genus of sea snails, marine gastropod mollusks in the family Seguenziidae.

Description
The conical shell contains a peripheral carina but no axial riblets, spiral lirae or microsculpture. The U-shaped posterior sinus is shallow. The anterolateral sinus is a channel. The basal sinus is present. The columella has no sinus or tooth. The aperture has a rhomboidal shape. There are no data about the radula.

Species
Species within the genus Thelyssina include:
Thelyssina sterrha Marshall, 1983

References

 
Seguenziidae